ChangeTheWorld: Ontario Youth Volunteer Challenge is a program to encourage Ontario youth ages 14 to 18 to take part in volunteerism. It also helps Ontario high school youth get their 40 hours community service required for graduation.

The Ontario Ministry of Citizenship and Immigration began the campaign in 2008 to mark National Volunteer Week. The campaign operates in partnership with the Ontario Volunteer Centre Network.

Role of volunteer centres
Participating volunteer centres engage in outreach activities in high schools to mobilize students to participate in community events or volunteer for community organizations during the campaign period. The Ontario Volunteer Centre Network works closely with local volunteer centres to help them achieve their youth volunteer targets each year.

Campaign growth
Since the campaign began in 2008, when about 900 volunteered in seven communities during National Volunteer Week, the campaign has grown every year since its inception. Since 2008, over 180,000 students have participated and volunteered more than 433,000 hours in their communities. In 2014 ChangeTheWorld grew to a six-week campaign and projected a total of 33,000 young people volunteering a minimum of 99,000 hours over the course of six weeks.

Types of activities
Students participate in many different types of volunteer activities, including tree planting, entertaining seniors, trail clean-up, fund-raising, food and clothing drives, fun-runs, community clean-ups, serving at homeless shelters, sewing sleepwear, leading fitness classes for seniors and artifact drives for local museums.

Celebrity support
Degrassi: The Next Generation, David Suzuki, Rob Dyer (Skate4Cancer), Fefe Dobson, Justin Bieber, Rick Mercer, Craig Kielburger, John Mitchell (Toronto Maple Leafs), Jarrett Jack (Toronto Raptors), Colin Doyle (Toronto Rock), Kevin Weekes, Don Cherry and Ron MacLean.

Participating communities
Alliston, Belleville, Brockville, Burlington, Cambridge, Chatham – Kent, Guelph, Hamilton, Kitchener-Waterloo, Kingston, London, Markham, Midland, Mississauga - Brampton – Caledon, Ottawa, Sault Ste. Marie, St Catharines, Niagara Falls, Orilla, Sarnia, Sudbury, Thunder Bay, Toronto, Windsor

References

External links
 Ontario 2010 Youth Volunteer Challenge Webpage 
 Ontario Volunteer Centre Network 

Organizations based in Ontario